As of 2013, illegal immigration in Nigeria is a serious problem and the border has become quite porous. According to the Government there are 1,497 illegal migration points to enter the country. The government is investing millions to secure the border. People from Niger are biggest group of illegal immigrants.

References

Society of Nigeria
Nigeria
Nigeria